Buona Vista MRT station is a Mass Rapid Transit (MRT) interchange station on the East West line and Circle line in Queenstown, Singapore. This station is close to one-north, a high technology business park for the biomedical science, infocomm technology and media industries. It is located near the junction of North Buona Vista Road, Commonwealth Avenue and Commonwealth Avenue West.

History

Buona Vista station opened on 12 March 1988, as part of Phase 1B of the MRT line which runs from Outram Park to Clementi. The station was initially planned to be linked to a Light Rail Transit line that would have served residents living near the area, as well as students from the National University of Singapore and Singapore Polytechnic, as announced by Singapore's then-Communications Minister Mah Bow Tan. However, it was eventually not built due to its lack of economic viability.

Following the 25 March 2005 accident, the Land Transport Authority (LTA) made the decision in 2008 to install platform screen doors in this station, whereby operations commenced on 10 June 2011.

Circle line interchange
With the construction of the Circle line from 11 January 2005, the bridge was demolished and replaced with a newer one. The second level of the East West line station was also converted into a transfer level between the two lines. The Circle line platforms were opened on 8 October 2011, while the two new exits share the same location as the original one.

Station Details 
The station is located along Buona Vista Road, near The Star Vista.

East West Line 
The station is situated between Commonwealth and Dover stations. Its official station code is “EW21”.

The station consists of an island platform, with doors opening on the left.

Circle Line 
The station is situated between Holland Village and one-north stations. Its other official station code is “CC22”.

The station consist of one island platform, with doors opening on the left. The seats are dots in matrices, spelling the station's name.

Art in Transit 
The artwork featured under the Art in Transit programme is The Tree of Life by Gilles Massot. Located on the lift shaft in the underground station, the artwork depicts a eucalyptus tree located at the nearby Kent Ridge Park that has been digitally edited to create an effect similar to David Hockney's photo montages. The tree also represents the jungle greenery which used to exist next to the above-ground station and is a result of the deep impression left on the artist of the landscape and view of the area.

References

External links

 

Railway stations in Singapore opened in 1988
Queenstown, Singapore
Mass Rapid Transit (Singapore) stations